Fudge Rounds are fudgy, round snack cakes made by Little Debbie. They are made by gluing two chewy chocolate cookies together with a light brown fudge creme. Finally, the two cookies are striped with light brown fudge.

Nutrition
Allergy Information: Fudge Rounds contain wheat, milk, eggs, and soy, and are manufactured on equipment that processes products containing peanuts and tree nuts.

See also

External links
Little Debbie Fudge Rounds  - Official product page

Brand name snack foods
 McKee Foods brands